Embryoglossa is a genus of snout moths. It was described by Warren in 1896, and is known from Nigeria, Madagascar, and India.

Species
 Embryoglossa aethiopicalis Gaede, 1916
 Embryoglossa bipuncta Hampson, 1903
 Embryoglossa submarginata (Kenrick, 1917)
 Embryoglossa variegata Warren, 1896

References

Pyralinae
Pyralidae genera